Yuen Po Street Bird Garden is located in Mong Kok, Kowloon, Hong Kong, directly west of Mong Kok Stadium and near Mong Kok East station.

History
The garden was established after the former "Bird Street" at Hong Lok Street (雀仔街), off Argyle Street, was demolished by the former Land Development Corporation (now the Urban Renewal Authority) in the early 1990s. Langham Place was built on the site of the former Bird Street. Construction of the replacement garden was completed in March 1997 on a more peripheral site.

The market was closed on 5 July 2012, following a positive swab sample of H5N1 avian influenza virus, from a bird cage of oriental magpie-robins. It was closed for 21 days and re-opened on 26 July. Each of the 69 affected shops were compensated with HK$12,000 and their rents waived for a month by the Agriculture, Fisheries and Conservation Department.

References

External links
 

Mong Kok
Retail markets in Hong Kong
Urban public parks and gardens in Hong Kong